Christian de la Campa Kindal (November 15, 1981) is a Mexican-American actor and model.

Early life 
Christian de la Campa Kindall was born on November 16, 1981 in Houston, TX. He is the son of Mexican father and American mother, moved at a very young age to Mexico where he grew up and received his academic education.

Christian joined the Air Force Academy in the United States where he was trained as an aircraft mechanic and where he stayed for 6 years. While conducting studies of Criminal Justice, Christian gets a call from Televisa and later decided to study acting at the Center for Arts Education "CEA" Televisa where he graduated in December 2010. That same year he participated in the theater play "La Vida No Vale Nada" created and directed by Luiz Mario Moncada.

Career 
He began his career modeling and participated in several model competitions. In 2010 he worked as a model for "Victoria's Secrets Fashion Show". In the same year he graduated as an actor at the Center for Arts Education "CEA". In 2011 he participated in Mr. Mexico 2011.

He began his acting career in the Mexican television network Televisa, where he participated in two soap operas. In 2012 he joins Telemundo, and participate in soap operas such as Relaciones peligrosas, La Patrona and Santa Diabla. In 2014 he participated in the contest program of Telemundo, Top Chefs Estrellas.

At the end of 2014 was confirmed as the main protagonist of the telenovela Tierra de reyes, where he shared credits with Aarón Díaz and Gonzalo García Vivanco.

Filmography

Film

Television

Awards and nominations

References

External links 

21st-century Mexican male actors
Male actors from Guadalajara, Jalisco
Living people
Mexican male telenovela actors
1981 births